Vincent Peter Colaiuta (born February 5, 1956) is an American drummer who has worked as a session musician in many genres. He was inducted into the Modern Drummer Hall of Fame in 1996 and the Classic Drummer Hall of Fame in 2014. Colaiuta has won one Grammy Award and has been nominated twice.  Since the late 1970s, he has recorded and toured with Frank Zappa, Joni Mitchell, and Sting, among many other appearances in the studio and in concert.

Career 
Colaiuta was given his first drum kit when he was seven. He took to it naturally, with little instruction. When he was fourteen, the school band teacher gave him a book that taught him some of the basics. Buddy Rich was his favorite drummer until he heard the album Ego by Tony Williams, an event that changed his life.  Colaiuta was also listening to organ groups, notably Jack McDuff, Jimmy McGriff and Don Patterson.

While a student at Berklee College of Music, when jazz fusion was on the rise, he listened to and admired Alphonse Mouzon and Billy Cobham.

After leaving school, he played local gigs in Boston. He joined a brief tour organized by Al Kooper, then worked in California on an album by Christopher Morris, which Kooper was producing. Although he returned to Boston, Colaiuta was drawn back to California by friends. He took the bus from Boston to Los Angeles during the Great Blizzard of 1978. After performing in jazz clubs, he won the audition to play drums for Frank Zappa. He toured with Zappa and appeared on the albums Joe's Garage, Tinsel Town Rebellion, and Shut Up 'n Play Yer Guitar.

Modern Drummer magazine chose Joe's Garage as one of the top 25 drum performances of all time. Colaiuta was called out by name by Dale Bozzio (playing the character of Mary) in the lyrics of the song Catholic Girls.

In 1981, he left touring with Zappa to become a studio musician, recording for the band Pages and pop singer Gino Vannelli. Opportunities arose with saxophonist Tom Scott and bassist Larry Klein, who invited Colaiuta to play on a record by Klein's then-girlfriend, Joni Mitchell. When Klein and Mitchell got married, Colaiuta was the best man at their wedding. During the 1980s, he toured with Mitchell. In 1986, he became the house drummer of The Late Show Starring Joan Rivers. The band was led by Mark Hudson and is called the Party Boys and the Tramp.

By the end of the 1980s he was living the busy life of a studio musician, recording albums, doing TV and film work during the day, and playing clubs at night. In addition to pop acts, he has worked with jazz musicians Herbie Hancock, Chick Corea, Buell Neidlinger, and the Buddy Rich Big Band.

In 1990, Colaiuta got a phone call from Sting, flew to England, and won the audition to become a member of his band. He remained with Sting for much of the 1990s, touring and recording the albums Ten Summoner's Tales (1993), Mercury Falling (1996), Brand New Day (1999) and Sacred Love (2003). On November 12, 2016, he played with Sting in the first concert to be held at the Bataclan in Paris since the terrorist attack a year earlier.

In 1994, he released his debut solo album. He has won over fifteen Drummer of the Year awards from Modern Drummer magazine's annual reader polls. These include ten awards in the "Best Overall" category.

Partial discography

As leader 
 1994 Vinnie Colaiuta (Stretch)
 2018 Descent into Madness (A-Tone Recordings)
 2021 Mother's Milk (A-Tone Recordings)

With Jing Chi (with Robben Ford and Jimmy Haslip)
 2002 Jing Chi
 2003 Jing Chi Live at Yoshi's
 2004 3D
 2017 Supremo

With Mark Isham
 2019 Hard Candy (A-Tone Recordings)

As sideman 
With Joni Mitchell
 1982 Wild Things Run Fast
 1985 Dog Eat Dog
 1991 Night Ride Home

With Tom Scott
 1982 Desire
 1987 Streamlines
 1988 Flashpoint
 1999 Smokin' Section

With Sting
 1993 Ten Summoner's Tales
 1996 Mercury Falling
 1999 Brand New Day
 2003 Sacred Love
 2016 57th & 9th

With Frank Zappa
 1979 Joe's Garage
 1981 Tinseltown Rebellion
 1981 Shut Up 'n Play Yer Guitar
 1983 The Man From Utopia
 1988 Guitar
 1991 Any Way the Wind Blows
 1995 Strictly Commercial
 1988 You Can't Do That on Stage Anymore, Vol. 1
 1991 You Can't Do That on Stage Anymore, Vol. 4
 1992 You Can't Do That on Stage Anymore, Vol. 6
 1996 The Lost Episodes (1996)
 1996 Frank Zappa Plays the Music of Frank Zappa: A Memorial Tribute
 1997 Have I Offended Someone?
 1999 Son of Cheep Thrills
 2003 Halloween
 2006 Trance-Fusion
 2007 Buffalo
 2016 Chicago '78

With others

 1981 Nightwalker, Gino Vannelli
 1982 Tvær Systur, Jakob Magnusson
 1982 Championship Wrestling, Al Kooper
 1982 Quiet Lies, Juice Newton
 1982 Times of Our Lives, Judy Collins
 1982 Everyman A King (Avalon EP) , Avalon
 1983 Dirty Looks, Juice Newton
 1983 Not the Boy Next Door, Peter Allen
 1983 Imagination, Helen Reddy
 1983 Youngblood, Carl Wilson
 1983 Walk a Fine Line, Paul Anka
 1984 Emotion, Barbra Streisand
 1984 Qualifying Heat, Thelma Houston
 1985 Soul Kiss, Olivia Newton-John
 1986 Smoke Signals, Smokey Robinson
 1986 The Bridge, Billy Joel
 1986 Te Amaré, José Feliciano
 1987 John Patitucci, John Patitucci
 1987 Northern Nights, Dan Siegel
 1987 Famous Blue Raincoat, Jennifer Warnes
 1987 Swing Street, Barry Manilow
 1987 Portrait, Lee Ritenour
 1988 Close-Up, David Sanborn
 1988 Last Days of the Century, Al Stewart
 1988 Talk to Your Daughter, Robben Ford
 1988 The Real Me, Patti Austin
 1988 I'm Your Man, Leonard Cohen
 1988 Get Here, Brenda Russell
 1988 Positive, Peabo Bryson
 1988 Voices of the Heart, Eric Marienthal
 1988 Y Kant Tori Read, Tori Amos
 1988 Bossa Nova Hotel, Michael Sembello
 1989 Mr. Jordan, Julian Lennon
 1989 Music, My Love, Jean-Pierre Rampal
 1989 Big Harvest, Indio
 1989 Secrets, Allan Holdsworth
 1989 Barry Manilow, Barry Manilow
 1989 The Warmer Side of Cool, Wang Chung
 1989 The Works, Nik Kershaw
 1989 Upright, Philip Aaberg
 1989 Other Places, Brandon Fields
 1990 Tales from the Bulge, Michael Landau
 1990 Blue Pacific, Michael Franks
 1990 Beth Nielsen Chapman, Beth Nielsen Chapman
 1990 Other Voices, Paul Young
 1991 House of Hope, Toni Childs
 1991 Free, Rick Astley
 1991 Discipline, Desmond Child
 1991 Swept, Julia Fordham
 1991 Still, Tony Banks
 1992 The Future, Leonard Cohen
 1992 Life Is Messy, Rodney Crowell
 1992 Fat City, Shawn Colvin
 1992 The Hunter, Jennifer Warnes
 1993 My World, Ray Charles
 1993 Rendezvous, Christopher Cross
 1994 Emperors of Soul, The Temptations
 1994 Heart to Heart, Diane Schuur, B.B. King
 1994 The Whiff of Bedlam, James Reyne
 1995 Good News from the Next World, Simple Minds
 1995 Soul Survivor, Bobby Caldwell
 1995 The Promise, John McLaughlin
 1995 I'll Lead You Home, Michael W. Smith
 1995 Time Was, Curtis Stigers
 1995 Time for Change, Wendy Moten
 1995 If My Heart Had Wings, Melissa Manchester
 1995 No Resemblance Whatsoever, Dan Fogelberg
 1995 Out of My Hands, Jennifer Rush
 1996 It's Good, Eve, Vonda Shepard
 1996 Eat the Phikis, Elio e le Storie Tese
 1997 Blue Moon Swamp, John Fogerty
 1997 Angelica, Angelica
 1997 Blue Tav, Steve Tavaglione
 1998 Traeme La Noche, Gustavo Cerati, Andy Summers
 1998 Spirit, Jewel
 1998 Leave a Mark, John Michael Montgomery
 1999 August Everywhere, Blinker the Star
 1999 Amarte Es Un Placer, Luis Miguel
 1999 Deja Vu, Frank Vignola
 1999 The Whole SHeBANG, SheDaisy
 2000 Celebrating the Music of Weather Report, Jason Miles
 2000 Lara Fabian, Lara Fabian
 2000 Fingerprints, Larry Carlton
 2000 My Kind of Christmas, Christina Aguilera
 2000 Paris Rain, Brenda Russell
 2000 Isn't She Great, Burt Bacharach
 2000 Live From Blue Note Tokyo, Chick Corea
 2000 Two Against Nature, Steely Dan
 2001 Aura, Asia
 2001 Night Sessions, Chris Botti
 2001 Christmas Memories, Barbra Streisand
 2001 Trouble in Shangri-La, Stevie Nicks
 2001 The Spirit Room, Michelle Branch
 2001 Shared Secrets, George Cables
 2001 The Well, Jennifer Warnes
 2001 MTV Unplugged, Alejandro Sanz
 2002 Santo Pecado, Ricardo Arjona
 2002 Cry, Faith Hill
 2002 Man with a Memory, Joe Nichols
 2002 The Season for Romance, Lee Ann Womack
 2002 Morning, Noon, & Night, Bob James
 2002 Queen of the Damned: Music from the Motion Picture
 2002 Twisted Angel, LeAnn Rimes
 2003 1, 2, to the Bass, Stanley Clarke
 2003 Big Fun, Bill Evans
 2003 Bette Midler Sings the Rosemary Clooney Songbook, Bette Midler
 2003 Clean Up, Ilse DeLange
 2003 Now, Jessica Andrews
 2003 Michael Bublé, Michael Bublé
 2003 Before the Beginning, Aja Daashuur
 2004 Earth + Sky, Andy Summers
 2004 The Dana Owens Album, Queen Latifah
 2004 Renee Olstead, Renee Olstead
 2004 The Futurist, Robert Downey
 2004 A Christmas Album, James Taylor
 2004 That's Life, Julia Fordham
 2004 Speak, Lindsay Lohan
 2004 Heart & Soul, Joe Cocker
 2004 Motown Two, Michael McDonald
 2004 Second First Impression, Daniel Bedingfield
 2004 The System Has Failed, Megadeth
 2005 Fireflies, Faith Hill
 2005 Stronger Than Before, Olivia Newton-John
 2005 It's Time, Michael Bublé
 2005 A Little Soul in Your Heart, Lulu
 2005 Rock Swings, Paul Anka
 2005 This Woman, LeAnn Rimes
 2005 American Made World Played, Les Paul
 2006 Cool Yule, Bette Midler
 2006 Rendezvous in Rio, Michael Franks
 2006 Whatever We Wanna, LeAnn Rimes
 2006 Givin' It Up, George Benson, Al Jarreau
 2006 Back in Town, Matt Dusk
 2006 Awake, Josh Groban
 2006 Navidades, Luis Miguel
 2006 James Taylor at Christmas, James Taylor
 2007 Resurgence, Mark Isaacs
 2007 Do svitanja, Vlado Georgiev
 2007 Call Me Irresponsible, Michael Bublé
 2007 Home at Last, Billy Ray Cyrus
 2008 Jeff Beck: Performing This Week... Live at Ronnie Scott's, Jeff Beck
 2008 Meet Glen Campbell, Glen Campbell
 2008 Soul Speak, Michael McDonald
 2009 Five Peace Band Live Chick Corea, and John McLaughlin, with Christian McBride and Kenny Garrett
 2009 My One and Only Thrill, Melody Gardot
 2009 Crazy Love, Michael Bublé
 2009 Patrizio, Patrizio Buanne
 2009 Tide, Luciana Souza
 2010 Emotion & Commotion, Jeff Beck
 2010 Singularity, Robby Krieger
 2010 Strip Me, Natasha Bedingfield
 2010 Peculiar Life, Richard Page
 2010 Truth Be Told, Mark Egan
 2011 Ghost on the Canvas, Glen Campbell
 2011 Daydream, Katherine Jenkins
 2011 Christmas, Michael Bublé
 2011 Umbigobunker!?, Jay Vaquer
 2012 5th House, Dominic Miller
 2012 Kisses on the Bottom, Paul McCartney
 2013 Unstoppable Momentum, Joe Satriani
 2013 A Mary Christmas, Mary J. Blige
 2013 Le Secret, Lara Fabian
 2013 Daljina, Vlado Georgiev
 2014 Map to the Treasure: Reimagining Laura Nyro, Billy Childs
 2014 Holiday Wishes, Idina Menzel
 2015 No Pier Pressure, Brian Wilson
 2015 Today Is Christmas, LeAnn Rimes
 2015 Shockwave Supernova, Joe Satriani
 2015 Beauty Behind the Madness, The Weeknd
 2015 Currency of Man, Melody Gardot
 2015 Stages, Josh Groban
 2016 The American Dream, Damian Drăghici
 2016 Encore un soir, Céline Dion
 2016 Remnants, LeAnn Rimes
 2016 Encore: Movie Partners Sing Broadway, Barbra Streisand
 2017 Moura, Ana Moura
 2017 Alone, Toto
 2017 Cosmopolitain, Kamil Rustam
 2018 Old Is New, Toto
 2018 Written in the Stars, MILI
 2018 Traces, Steve Perry
 2018 Another Time, Another Place, Jennifer Warnes
 2018 Liberation, Christina Aguilera
 2018 ARC Trio, Scott Kinsey, Jimmy Haslip, Gergő Borlai
 2019 Far More, Lari Basilio
 2019 Saab Guitar Project, Douglas Saab
 2019 War in My Mind, Beth Hart
 2020 Sunset in the Blue, Melody Gardot
 2020 Music... The Air That I Breathe, Cliff Richard
 2021 Liberation Time,  John McLaughlin

References

External links

1956 births
Living people
American people of Italian descent
Berklee College of Music alumni
American session musicians
People from Brownsville, Pennsylvania
Grammy Award winners
American jazz musicians
20th-century American drummers
American male drummers
Jazz musicians from Pennsylvania
American male jazz musicians
20th-century American male musicians